Liridon Selmani (born 12 June 1992) is an Albanian footballer, who plays for Andersbergs IK as a forward.

Selmani has been part of Albania U21 starting in 2012.

References

External links

Liridon Selmani at Fotbolltransfers

1992 births
Living people
Association football forwards
Halmstads BK players
Allsvenskan players
Superettan players
Swedish footballers
Expatriate footballers in Norway